Bernabé Zapata Miralles was the defending champion but lost in the quarterfinals to Andrej Martin.

Daniel Altmaier won the title after defeating Martin 3–6, 6–1, 6–4 in the final.

Seeds

Draw

Finals

Top half

Bottom half

References

External links
Main draw
Qualifying draw

Heilbronner Neckarcup - 1
2022 Singles